Gerald "Gerry" Austgarden (born January 7, 1964) is a Canadian wheelchair curler, 2006 Winter Paralympics champion.

Teams

References

External links 

Gerry Austgarden - BGR Wealth and Estate Planning - Kelowna, British Columbia | Raymond James Ltd. 

Living people
1964 births
People from Fort St. John, British Columbia
Canadian male curlers
Curlers from British Columbia
Canadian wheelchair curlers
Paralympic wheelchair curlers of Canada
Paralympic gold medalists for Canada
Paralympic medalists in wheelchair curling
Wheelchair curlers at the 2006 Winter Paralympics
Medalists at the 2006 Winter Paralympics
Canadian wheelchair curling champions
21st-century Canadian people